Red Deer River is a river in the Canadian provinces of Saskatchewan and Manitoba. It has its source at Nut Lake in east central Saskatchewan and from there, it flows east towards Manitoba where it empties into Dawson Bay of Lake Winnipegosis. To the north of Red Deer's basin is the Saskatchewan River, to the south-west is the upper Assiniboine River, and to the south-east is Swan River.

Course 
The Red Deer River begins at the north end of Nut Lake near Highway 349 and west of Porcupine Hills in east central Saskatchewan. From Nut Lake, it heads north past Greenwater Lake Provincial Park towards Pré-Ste-Marié. From there, near the junctions of Highways 679 and 773, it turns east towards the town of Hudson Bay and the Hudson Bay Regional Park, which is the site of a former North West Company fort named Fort Red Deer River. From Hudson Bay, it continues eastward and is the divide between the Pasquia Hills to the north and the Porcupine Hills to the south. It also passes through provincial forests such as Porcupine and Pasquia. From the forests and hills, it continues eastward into Manitoba where  past the border, it opens up into Red Deer Lake. The river continues from the east side of Red Deer Lake for about  until it empties into Dawson Bay of Lake Winnipegosis. Near the point where it empties into Dawson Bay, it crosses Highway 10, which is part of the Northern Woods and Water Route. That is also the location of Red Deer River Provincial Park.

In 1757, a Hudson Bay Company fur trading post was established alongside the Red Deer River near the village of Erwood. In 1790, the North West Trading Company set up a trading post at the mouth of the Etomami River called Fort Red Deer River. On the river bank opposite the mouth of the Etomami River, there are the remains of another fort that is believed to be that of the American Fur Company.

Tributaries 
The source of the Red Deer River is Nut Lake, of which several creeks and rivers flow into, including Pipestone Creek and Prairie Butte Creek. As the river flows eastward, it is joined by several rivers and creeks. Much of the Pasquia and Procupine Hills fall within the river's watershed.

Red Deer River tributaries from upstream to downstream, not counting ones flowing into either Nut or Red Deer Lakes:
Barrier River
Slough Creek
Greenwater Creek
Horsehide Creek
Bannock Creek
Prairie River
Valley Creek
Salas Creek
Greenbush River
Jumper Creek
Fir River
Nonsuch Creek
Etomami River
Piwei River
Shand Creek
Pepaw River
Boundary Creek
Bubbling Creek
Willow Creek
Smoking Tent Creek
Lost River
Rice River
Little Rice River
Baden Creek
Sucker Creek

Fish species 
Several types of fish live in the river, including freshwater drum, brown bullhead, common carp, goldeye, northern pike, and brown trout.

See also 
List of rivers of Manitoba
List of rivers of Saskatchewan
Hudson Bay drainage basin

References 

Rivers of Manitoba
Rivers of Saskatchewan
Tributaries of Hudson Bay